Ahn Jae-mo (born September 20, 1979) is a South Korean actor and singer. Ahn is best known for playing gangster-turned-politician Kim Du-han in Rustic Period (2002). He has appeared in other period dramas such as Tears of the Dragon (1996), The King and the Queen (1998), The King and I (2007), The King of Legend (2010), and Jeong Do-jeon (2014). Ahn also became a car racing driver in 2004.

Filmography

Television series

Film

Variety show

Music video

Musical theatre

Discography

Awards and nominations

References

External links
 
 
 

1979 births
Living people
South Korean male television actors
South Korean male film actors
South Korean male singers
South Korean male musical theatre actors
People from Busan
Best New Actor Paeksang Arts Award (television) winners